Wagmare Suresh Ganapat (born 15 September 1961) is a member of the 14th Lok Sabha of India. He represents the Wardha constituency of Maharashtra and is a member of the Bharatiya Janata Party (BJP) political party.

External links
 Official biographical sketch in Parliament of India website

Living people
1961 births
People from Maharashtra
India MPs 2004–2009
Marathi politicians
Bharatiya Janata Party politicians from Maharashtra
People from Wardha
People from Wardha district
Lok Sabha members from Maharashtra